The New York Times Manual of Style and Usage: The Official Style Guide Used by the Writers and Editors of the World's Most Authoritative Newspaper is a style guide first published in 1950 by editors at the newspaper and revised in 1974, 1999, and 2002 by Allan M. Siegal and William G. Connolly. According to the Times Deputy News Editor Philip B. Corbett (in charge of revising the manual) in 2007, the newspaper maintains an updated, intranet version of the manual that is used by NYT staff, but this online version is not available to the general public. An e-book version of this fifth edition was issued in February 2015,  and it was released in paperback form in September 2015 (Three Rivers Press).

The New York Times Manual has various differences from the more influential Associated Press Stylebook. As some examples, the NYT Manual: 
Uses s for possessives even for a word/name ending in s
Gives rationales for many practices for which AP simply states a rule
Is strictly alphabetical and thus self-indexed, while AP has separate sections for sports and weather entries, and combines many entries under such terms as "weapons"
Has some whimsical entries – such as one for how to spell shh – in contrast to APs drier, more utilitarian format (though the NYT book is not alone in its tone among journalistic style guides)
Requires that the surnames of subjects be prefixed with a courtesy title (such as Dr., Mr., Ms., or Mrs.). However, since about 2015, courtesy titles have not been used in sports pages, pop culture, and fine arts.  Also, after the first use of honorifics denoting posts (such as President or Professor, but not Dr.) in an article, the person is subsequently referred to by an egalitarian courtesy title (e.g. 'President Biden' then 'Mr. Biden').

References 

1999 non-fiction books
Manual of Style and Usage
Style guides for American English
Journalism standards

External links